Craig Moir (born 25 September 1973 in Aberdeen) is a retired Scottish rugby footballer who played for Northampton Saints and represented Scotland at rugby union.

Club career
Born in Aberdeen, Moir played for Milford Haven and Llanelli before joining Northampton Saints in 1993, just in time to experience the pain of relegation from the then First Division. the following season saw promotion back to the top division achieved at the first attempt, and Moir was a regular in the Saints side for the remainder of the decade, including the starting line-up for the 2000 Heineken Cup final.

After nine years at the Saints, Moir moved to Scotland’s newly formed pro team Border Reivers in 2002. He then moved to the Bedford Blues where he joined a growing roster of ex-Saints players at Goldington Road. At the blues he won his first piece of domestic silverware in his final season winning the Powergen Shield at Twickenham.

International career
Moir won his first cap for Scotland against Wales on 18 March 2000, replacing Kenny Logan for the first of three caps the last of which was against New Zealand during the summer tour of the same year.
He suffered a double-fracture and dislocation of his ankle playing at Rotherham which prevented a further run to compete for the national jersey. He was out for five months before his return to action and further injuries prevented him from adding more caps to his tally.

References

External links
 Craig Moir on ESPN Scrum

1973 births
Living people
Scottish rugby union players
Rugby union wings
Rugby union players from Aberdeen
Border Reivers players
Northampton Saints players
Bedford Blues players
Scotland international rugby union players